Dicționarul explicativ al limbii române ("The Explanatory Dictionary of the Romanian Language", known under the abbreviation of DEX) is the most important dictionary of the Romanian language, published by the Institute of Linguistics of the Romanian Academy (Institutul de Lingvistică "Iorgu Iordan – Al. Rosetti").

Editorial history
It was first edited in 1975. In 1988 a supplement, named DEX-S, was published, which included omissions of the previous edition. The second edition was published in 1996 and it included some new definitions and the spelling changes of 1993. This edition has over 65,000 main entries. The last edition was published in 2016 and contains 67,000 entries.

Notes 

Romanian dictionaries